Australia's Best Backyards is an Australian lifestyle TV series on the Seven Network.  The program is hosted by landscape gardener Jamie Durie, who previously hosted Backyard Blitz on the Nine Network.

The first episode aired on Sunday 29 July 2007 at 6:30 pm.  The premiere episode rated 1.4 million viewers and was the 17th most watched program for the week.

See also 
 List of Australian television series

References

External links 
 Australia's Best Backyards
 Larundel Homestead – The Garden that Made Jamie Durie change careers – Featured in Episode 1
 

Australian non-fiction television series
Seven Network original programming
2007 Australian television series debuts
Gardening television